Lodhi colony railway station is a small railway station in Lodhi colony which is a residential and commercial neighborhood of South Delhi area of Delhi. Its code is LDCY. The station is part of  Delhi Suburban Railway. The station consists of two platforms. Presently no passenger trains stop at this station.

See also
 Hazrat Nizamuddin railway station
 New Delhi Railway Station
 Delhi Junction Railway station
 Anand Vihar Railway Terminal
 Sarai Rohilla Railway Station
 Delhi Metro

References

External links

Railway stations in South Delhi district
Delhi railway division